Winds Across the Bay (Winds) was a non-profit youth orchestra founded in 1993 in the East Bay Area city of El Cerrito, California, with the philosophy that "opportunities must be provided to support and encourage youth in the study and love of instrumental music". It was open to middle and high school students who displayed a high-intermediate to advanced musical proficiency in any wind, brass or percussion instrument, as well as a desire to enhance their ability in the instrumental performing arts.

Winds featured The Minors, a middle-school ensemble designed for entry-level and intermediate and The Majors, an ensemble for advanced and experienced musicians.

Winds offered Tuesday evening rehearsals starting in September thru May, with three concerts each year: winter and spring concerts usually held at the Lesher Center for the Performing Arts, and summer session concerts at various locations.

Winds worked with many local schools to augment the musical instruction being provided, and to afford youth musicians the opportunity to play high-profile performances in their own communities, such as the Lesher Center.

Member schools
Member organizations include:

 El Cerrito High School
 El Sobrante Christian School
 Albany High School
 Berkeley High School
 Piedmont High School
 St. Mary's High School
 School of the Madeleine
 Marin Academy
 Pinole Valley High School
 Holy Names High School
 Del Valle High School
 Pacific Academy
 Portola Middle School
 Hercules High School
 Albany Middle School
 Kensington Hilltop School

References

External links
Winds Across the Bay Youth Orchestra website
WAB performing Winds of Poseidon in 2013 
Parchment Extra Curricular Profile
2007 Benefit Concert

1993 establishments in California
2019 disestablishments in California
American youth orchestras
Disbanded American orchestras
El Cerrito, California
Musical groups established in 1993
Musical groups disestablished in 2019
Musical groups from the San Francisco Bay Area
Non-profit organizations based in the San Francisco Bay Area
Orchestras based in California
Organizations based in Contra Costa County, California
Youth organizations based in California